Calypsis ( –  or ) is the act of covering, concealing, hiding, or veiling. The term calypsis can also refer to a bride placing a veil over her face during her wedding while preparing to marry her groom, or to a criminal concealing his/her face with a ski mask while perpetrating a burglary, robbery, or sniper attack. Calypses (plural of calypsis) are done in many different ways by various people in various situations for various reasons (including for defensive purposes), and are often done subconsciously like most other forms of body language. In kinesics, the science of body language, calypsis is the act of covering or concealing certain parts of one's own body. Calypsis is a type of closed, negative or defensive body language used to express disapproval, discomfort or fear in certain situations. The term usually refers to the act of covering or concealing one's face, or sexually attractive parts (including certain sexually attractive clothing), especially in the presence of someone who is a sexual turn-off (extremely anerotic), or someone who is uncomfortable to be around. Calypsis is a type of closed or negative body language often expressing extremely anerotic feelings, sexual abhorrence, scorn and contempt toward someone viewed as a sexual turn-off in terms of physical appearance, in terms of personality and social behavior, or both.

External links
 What is body language?
 Closed body language
 Defensive body language

Further reading
Deciphering the Secret Messages of Body Language by Steve Youmans
500 Secrets About Girls Every Guy Should Know by Cucan Pemo

Nonverbal communication